Rubia's Jungle  is a 1970 Dutch film directed by Pim de la Parra.

Cast

External links 
 

Dutch romantic drama films
1970 films
1970s Dutch-language films